A Book of prophecies or Chrismologion (also Chresmologion; ; latinized Chrismologium) is a genre of literature of the Renaissance and the Early Modern period which collects prophecies or methods of divination.

The Chrismologion of Paisios Ligarides (c. 1652) was a collection of prophecies to the effect that the Russian Christians will defeat the Ottomans and liberate Constantinople are dedicated to the Tsar.
Similarly, a Russian translation of a 1673 Greek Chrismologion was dedicated to the Tsar by Nikolai Spathari.

Bohemian astronomer Martin Horký published a series of almanachs entitled Chrysmologium Physico-Astromanticum during the years 1639–1645 containing both astronomical calculations  and astrological predictions for the year in question.

See also
Book of Prophecies (Columbus)

References

Prophecy
Divination